The Klang Komuter station (formerly known as the Klang railway station) is a train station served by the KTM Komuter's Port Klang Line train service in Malaysia. It is located at Jalan Besar, in the southern area of Klang. Parallel to this station is a KTM depot for locomotive and for repairing of freight wagons.

The Klang station is located close to the central part of Klang town. It is served by a dedicated taxi and mini bus service. Klang Komuter Station is within walking distance of Klang's Central Bus Hub, which provides connectivity to the whole of Klang and the surrounding areas.

The main station building is a small single storied tiled roofed building that was originally built in 1890 but has undergone numerous renovation works; however, the Western colonial architecture of the station remains. Klang station has a side platform part of the main station building and an island platform reachable by a pedestrian bridge.

Recently Klang station has undergone upgrades where taller, and wider canopies have been erected on its island platform to replace its narrower outdated versions. However, the main station building nor its facilities have yet to see any major upgrades. There is a new multi storey carpark, opened since 2019.

Service

Klang Station is served by the KTM Komuter service via the Port Klang Line, with intervals of 20-40 minutes. Services currently offered are a Port Klang-KL Sentral shuttle service and a through service to and from Tanjong Malim 13 times a day.

Station Facilities and Services
The following facilities and services are available at this station.

 Touch N Go Lane
 Ticket Counter
 Ticket Vending Machine
 Public Toilets

Around the station
Klang Station is situated at the middle of Klang old town surrounded by historical sites in walking distance. Known as one of the oldest towns in Malaysia, Klang is rich in history, tradition and customs.
 Church of Our Lady of Lourdes Klang
 Gedung Raja Abdullah (Museum)
 Istana Alam Shah (Royal Palace)
 Klang Magistrate Court Complex
 Little India (Along Jalan Tengku Kelana)
 Sri Nagara Thandayuthapani Temple
 Sultan Abdul Aziz Royal Gallery
 Sultan Sulaiman Royal Mosque
 Sultan Sulaiman Stadium (Klang Sport Center)
 Tengku Kelana Indian Muslim Mosque
The Royal Klang Town Heritage Walk on every Saturday and Sunday morning is a free guided tour.

Platform layout at Klang Komuter station

External links
Klang KTM Komuter Station

References 

Klang (city)
Railway stations in Selangor
Rapid transit stations in Selangor
Port Klang Line